This is a list of broadcast television stations that are licensed in the U.S. state of Connecticut.

Full-power stations

Current full-power stations
VC refers to the station's PSIP virtual channel. RF refers to the station's physical RF channel.

Defunct full-power station
 Channel 43: WICC-TV - Dumont/ABC - Bridgeport (3/29/1953-12/8/1960)

LPTV stations

Current low-power stations

Defunct low-power stations
 Channel 6: W06BP - New Haven - Zenon Reynarowych, Licensee; George Kowal, Engineer
 Channel 10: W10BQ - New Haven 
 Channel 11: W11BJ - Hartford
 Channel 12: W12BH -  CPTV - Waterbury (launched in 1979, ceased <2009)
 Channel 17: W17CD - Stamford - Zenon Reynarowych, Licensee; George Kowal, Engineer
 Channel 51: WNHX-LP - New Haven 
 Channel 59: W59AA: (WVIT) West Haven (signed off due to the launch of what is now WCTX)
 Channel 61: W61AC:  CPTV - Waterbury (launched in 1967, ceased in 1979 due to launch of WXTV translator)
 Channel 71: W71AG:  CPTV - New Haven (launched in 1967, ceased 1974)
 Channel 79: W79AI: (WVIT) - Torrington
 Channel 79: W79AH: (WVIT) - Waterbury (1960s)
 Channel 22: W22BN Danbury (Defunct, was Rai Italia) 

 Channel 28: W28AJ (West Haven)  (Defunct), now W24EZ-D

Cable TV station
 News 12 Connecticut (Norwalk)

See also
 MSG Network
 MSG Sportsnet
 NBC Sports Boston
 New England Sports Network
 SportsNet New York
 YES Network
 Free-to-air#North_America - Satellite

References

Connecticut

Television stations